National Tertiary Route 934, or just Route 934 (or ) is a National Road Route of Costa Rica, located in the Guanacaste province.

Description
In Guanacaste province the route covers Nicoya canton (Sámara district).

History
This route was severely damaged in November 2020 due to the indirect effects of Hurricane Eta.

References

Highways in Costa Rica